The 2010 West Oxfordshire District Council election took place on 6 May 2010 to elect members of West Oxfordshire District Council in Oxfordshire, England. One third of the council was up for election and the Conservative Party stayed in overall control of the council.

After the election, the composition of the council was:
Conservative 40
Liberal Democrats 7
Labour 1
Independent 1

Background
After the last election in 2008 the Conservatives controlled the council with 40 councillors, compared to six for the Liberal Democrats, two Independents and one Labour 16 seats were contested in 2010, with the council election taking place at the same time as the 2010 general election.

The Conservatives stood a full 16 candidates, while the Liberal Democrats had 13, Labour had eight, Greens 4 and there was one Independent candidate.

Election result
The Conservatives won 14 of the 16 seats contested to have 40 councillors. The Liberal Democrats gained a seat after winning the other two seats contested, while both Labour and an Independent were left with one seat. 10 of the 11 councillors who stood again were re-elected and overall turnout at the election was 72.45%.

Ward results

References

2010 English local elections
May 2010 events in the United Kingdom
2010
2010s in Oxfordshire